Nicholas Breton (also Britton or Brittaine) (c. 1545/53 – c. 1625/6) was a poet and prose writer of the English Renaissance.

Life
Nicholas belonged to an old family settled at Layer Breton, Essex. His father, William Breton, a London merchant who had made a considerable fortune, died in 1559, and his widow Elizabeth (née Bacon) married the poet George Gascoigne before her sons had attained their majority. Nicholas was probably born at the "capitall mansion house" in Red Cross Street, in the parish of St Giles without Cripplegate, mentioned in his father's will.

There is no official record of his residence at the university, but the diary of the Rev. Richard Madox tells us that he was at Antwerp in 1583 and was "once of Oriel College." He may have been the poet named "Mr Breton" who visited the court of James VI of Scotland in 1588 and received a gift of £160 Scots. He married Ann Sutton in 1593, and had a family. He is supposed to have died shortly after the publication of his last work, Fantastickes (1626). Breton found a patron in Mary, countess of Pembroke, and wrote much in her honour until 1601, when she seems to have withdrawn her favour. Some of the letters signed N.B. in A Poste with a Packet of Mad Letters (1603, enlarged 1637) may contain autobiographical details; the nineteenth letter of the second part contains a general complaint of many griefs, and proceeds as follows:

Hath another been wounded in the warres, fared hard, lain in a cold bed many a bitter storme, and beene at many a hard banquet? all these have I; another imprisoned? so have I; another long been sicke? so have I; another plagued with an unquiet life? so have I; another indebted to his hearts griefe, and faine would pay and cannot? so am I.

Works
Breton was a prolific author of considerable versatility and gift, popular with his contemporaries, but forgotten by the next generation. His work consists of religious and pastoral poems, satires, and a number of miscellaneous prose tracts. His religious poems are sometimes wearisome by their excess of fluency and sweetness, but they are evidently the expression of a devout and earnest mind. His lyrics are pure and fresh, and his romances, though full of conceits, are pleasant reading, remarkably free from grossness. His praise of the Virgin and his references to Mary Magdalene have suggested that he was a Roman Catholic, but his prose writings abundantly prove that he was an ardent Anglican.

Breton had little gift for satire, and his best work is to be found in his pastoral poetry. His Passionate Shepheard (1604) is full of sunshine and fresh air, and of unaffected gaiety. The third pastoral in this book—"Who can live in heart so glad / As the merrie country lad"—is well known; with some other of Breton's daintiest poems, among them the lullaby, "Come little babe, come silly soule," (This poem, however, comes from The Arbor of Amorous Devises, which is only in part Breton's work.) —it is incorporated in A. H. Bullen's Lyrics from Elizabethan Romances (1890). 

The printed editions of most of Breton's books are very rare and have great bibliographical value. His works, with the exception of some belonging to private owners, were collected by A. B. Grosart in the Chertsey Worthies Library (1879) with an elaborate introduction quoting the documents for the poet's history.

Fantastickes
Breton's keen observation of country life appears also in his prose idyll, Wits Trenckrnour, "a conference betwixt a scholler and an angler," and in his Fantastickes, a series of short prose pictures of the months, the Christian festivals and the hours, which throw much light on the customs of the times.

In 1942 the American composer Bernard Herrmann set part of Fantastickes as a piece for vocal soloists and orchestra, which he retitled The Fantasticks. He later recorded it much later with the National Philharmonic Orchestra. Herrmann brings the work to a conclusion in May, thereby altering the focus to one celebrating the arrival of spring.

Verse

Breton's poetical works, the titles of which are here somewhat abbreviated, include:
The Workes of a Young Wit (1577)
A Floorish upon Fancie (1577)
The Pilgrimage to Paradise (1592), with a prefatory letter by John Case
The Countess of Penbrook's Passion (manuscript), first printed by JO Halliwell-Phillipps in 1853 
Pasquil's Fooles cappe (entered at Stationers' Hall in 1600)
Pasquil's Mistresse (1600)
Pasquil's Passe and Passeth Not (1600)
Melancholike Humours (1600) – reprinted by Scholartis Press London. 1929.
Marie Magdalen's Love: a Solemne Passion of the Soules Love (1595), the first part of which, a prose treatise, is probably by another hand; the second part, a poem in six-lined stanza, is certainly by Breton
A Divine Poem, including "The Ravisht Soul" and "The Blessed Weeper" (1601)
An Excellent Poem, upon the Longing of a Blessed heart (1601)
The Soules Heavenly Exercise (1601)
The Soules Harmony (1602)
Olde Madcappe newe Gaily mawfrey (1602)
The Mother's Blessing (1602)
A True Description of Unthankfulnesse (1602)
The Passionate Shepheard (1604)
The Souies Immortail Crowne (1605)
The Honour of Valour (1605)
An Invective against Treason; I would and I would not (1614)
Bryton's Bowre of Delights (1591), edited by Dr Grosart in 1893, an unauthorised publication which contained some poems disclaimed by Breton
The Arbor of Amorous Devises (entered at Stationers' Hall, 1594), only in part Breton's
Contributions to England's Helicon (1600) and other verse miscellanies.

Prose

Auspicante Jehoua
Wit's Trenchmour (1597)
The Wil of Wit (1599)
Strange Fortunes of Two Excellent Princes
Crossing of Proverbs
Figure of Foure
Wonders Worth Hearing
A Poste with a Packet of Mad Letters (1602–6)
A Dialogue of Pithe
Grimello's Fortunes (1603)
[A Mad World My Masters, Mistake Me Not; Or] A Merrie Dialogue Betwixt the Taker and Mistaker (1603)
Olde Man's Lesson
I Pray You be Not Angrie
A Murmurer
Divine Considerations
Wit's Private Wealth
Characters upon Essaies
Good and Bad
Strange News out of Divers Countries (1622)
Fantasticks
Courtier and Countryman
Character of Queen Elizabeth
Mary Magdalen's Lamentations (1604) and The Passion of a Discontented Mind (1601) are sometimes erroneously ascribed to Breton
Sir Philip Sidney's Ourania by N. B. (1606)

Footnotes

References

External links
 
 
 
The Works in Prose and Verse of Nicholas Breton … in Two Volumes. Alexander B. Grosart (ed.) Edinburgh University Press, 1879. 
Vol. I.–Verse
Vol. II.–Prose

1540s births
1626 deaths
People from the Borough of Colchester
17th-century English poets
17th-century English male writers
17th-century English writers
16th-century English poets
Alumni of Oriel College, Oxford
English male poets